Option strategies are the simultaneous, and often mixed, buying or selling of one or more options that differ in one or more of the options' variables.  Call options, simply known as Calls, give the buyer a right to buy a particular stock at that option's strike price.  Opposite to that are Put options, simply known as Puts, which give the buyer the right to sell a particular stock at the option's strike price. This is often done to gain exposure to a specific type of opportunity or risk while eliminating other risks as part of a trading strategy.  A very straightforward strategy might simply be the buying or selling of a single option; however, option strategies often refer to a combination of simultaneous buying and or selling of options.

Options strategies allow traders to profit from movements in the underlying assets based on market sentiment (i.e., bullish, bearish or neutral).  In the case of neutral strategies, they can be further classified into those that are bullish on volatility, measured by the lowercase Greek letter sigma (σ), and those that are bearish on volatility.  Traders can also profit off time decay, measured by the uppercase Greek letter theta (Θ), when the stock market has low volatility.  The option positions used can be long and/or short positions in calls and puts.

Bullish strategies
Bullish options strategies are employed when the options trader expects the underlying stock price to move upwards. They can also use Theta (time decay) with a bullish/bearish combo called a Calendar Spread, when sideways movement is expected. The trader may also forecast how high the stock price may go and the time frame in which the rally may occur in order to select the optimum trading strategy for buying a bullish option.

The most bullish of options trading strategies, used by most options traders, is simply buying a call option.

The market is always moving. It's up to the trader to figure out what strategy fits the markets for that time period. Moderately bullish options traders usually set a target price for the bull run and utilize bull spreads to reduce cost or eliminate risk altogether. There is limited risk trading options by using the appropriate strategy. While maximum profit is capped for some of these strategies, they usually cost less to employ for a given nominal amount of exposure. There are options that have unlimited potential to the up or down side with limited risk if done correctly. The bull call spread and the bull put spread are common examples of moderately bullish strategies.

Mildly bullish trading strategies are options that make money as long as the underlying asset price does not decrease to the strike price by the option's expiration date. These strategies may provide downside protection as well. Writing out-of-the-money covered calls is a good example of such a strategy. The purchaser of the covered call is paying a premium for the option to purchase, at the strike price (rather than the market price), the assets you already own. This is how traders hedge a stock that they own when it has gone against them for a period of time.

Bearish strategies
Bearish options strategies are employed when the options trader expects the underlying  stock price to move downwards. It is necessary to assess how low the stock price can go and the time frame in which the decline will happen in order to select the optimum trading strategy. Selling a Bearish option is also another type of strategy that gives the trader a "credit". This does require a margin account.

The most bearish of options trading strategies is the simple put buying or selling strategy utilized by most options traders.

The market can make steep downward moves. Moderately bearish options traders usually set a target price for the expected decline and utilize bear spreads to reduce cost. This strategy has limited profit potential, but significantly reduces risk when done correctly. The bear call spread and the bear put spread are common examples of moderately bearish strategies.

Mildly bearish trading strategies are options strategies that make money as long as the underlying asset does not rise to the strike price by the options expiration date. However, you can add more options to the current position and move to a more advanced position that relies on Time Decay "Theta". These strategies may provide a small upside protection as well. In general, bearish strategies yield profit with less risk of loss.

Neutral or non-directional strategies
Neutral strategies in options trading are employed when the options trader does not know whether the underlying asset's price will rise or fall. Also known as non-directional strategies, they are so named because the potential to profit does not depend on whether the underlying price will increase or decrease. Rather, the correct neutral strategy to employ depends on the expected volatility of the underlying stock price.

Examples of neutral strategies are:

Guts - buy (long gut) or sell (short gut) a pair of ITM (in the money) put and call (compared to a strangle where OTM puts and calls are traded);
Butterfly - a neutral option strategy combining bull and bear spreads. Long butterfly spreads use four option contracts with the same expiration but three different strike prices to create a range of prices the strategy can profit from.
Straddle - an options strategy in which the investor holds a position in both a call and put with the same strike price and expiration date, paying both premiums (long straddle)
Strangle - where you buy a put below the stock and a call above the stock, with profit if the stock moves outside of either strike price (long strangle).
Risk reversal - simulates the motion of an underlying so sometimes these are referred as synthetic long or synthetic short positions depending on which position you are shorting;
Collar - buy the underlying and then simultaneous buying of a put option below current price (floor) and selling a call option above the current price (cap);
Condor – combination of two vertical spreads, similar to a butterfly but with a range of underlying values yielding the maximum profit
Fence - buy the underlying then simultaneous buying of options either side of the price to limit the range of possible returns;
Iron butterfly - sell two overlapping credit vertical spreads but one of the verticals is on the call side and one is on the put side;
Iron condor - the simultaneous buying of a put spread and a call spread with the same expiration and four different strikes.  An iron condor can be thought of as selling a strangle instead of buying and also limiting your risk on both the call side and put side by building a bull put vertical spread and a bear call vertical spread;
Calendar spread - the purchase of an option in one month and the simultaneous sale of an option at the same strike price (and underlying) in an earlier month, for a debit.
Jelly roll - a combination of two calendar spreads, used to profit from changes in interest rates or dividends

Bullish on volatility
Neutral trading strategies that are bullish on volatility profit when the underlying stock price experiences big moves upwards or downwards. They include the long straddle, long strangle, short condor (long Iron Condor), long butterfly, and long Calendar.

Bearish on volatility
Neutral trading strategies that are bearish on volatility profit when the underlying stock price experiences little or no movement. Such strategies include the short straddle, short strangle, ratio spreads, long condor, short butterfly, and  short calendar.

Option strategy profit / loss chart

A typical option strategy involves the purchase / selling of at least 2-3 different options (with different strikes and / or time to expiry), and the value of such portfolio may change in a very complex way.

One very useful way to analyze and understand the behavior of a certain option strategy is by drawing its Profit / Loss graph.

An option strategy profit / loss graph shows the dependence of the profit / loss on an option strategy at different base asset price levels and at different moments in time.

Option strategy payoff graphs
Following Black-Scholes option pricing model, the option's payoff, delta, and gamma (option greeks) can be investigated as time progress to maturity:

Profit charts
These are examples of charts that show the profit of the strategy as the price of the underlying varies.

See also
Barrier option
Binary option
Chicago Board Options Exchange
Options arbitrage
Options spread
Synthetic options position

References

External links

Options (finance)